Rainer Hunold (born 1 November 1949 in Brunswick, West Germany) is a German television actor.

Selected filmography
 (1978, TV miniseries)
Iron Gustav (1979, TV miniseries)
Derrick - Season 6, Episode 9: "Ein Kongreß in Berlin" (1979)
Derrick - Season 8, Episode 2: "Am Abgrund" (1981)
Sternensommer (1981, TV miniseries)
Mandara (1983, TV miniseries)
Beautiful Wilhelmine (1984, TV miniseries)
 (1986, TV miniseries)
Ein Fall für zwei (1988–1997, TV series)
 (1991, TV film)
Dr. Sommerfeld – Neues vom Bülowbogen (1997–2004, TV series)
Der Staatsanwalt (since 2005, TV series)

External links

ZBF Agency Cologne 

1949 births
Living people
German male television actors
20th-century German male actors
21st-century German male actors
Actors from Braunschweig